The Piano Concerto No. 2 in F major, Op. 35, was written by Anton Rubinstein in 1851, one year after his first concerto. Stylistically it is less clichéd than the first, yet it still displays the full virtuoso nature of the piano.

Structure

The concerto is in three movements:
I Allegro Vivace Assai
II Adagio Non Troppo
III Moderato

References
Notes

Sources

External links

Piano concerto 2
1851 compositions
Compositions in F major